Mark Twain and other Folk Favorites is the debut album by Harry Belafonte, released by RCA Victor in 1954.

Track listing 
 "Mark Twain" (Traditional, Harry Belafonte) – 3:42
 "Man Piaba" (Belafonte, Jack K. Rollins) – 3:30
 "John Henry" (Traditional) – 3:27
 "Tol' My Captain" (Paul Campbell) – 2:45
 "Kalenda Rock (Mourning Song)" (Traditional) – 3:2
 "The Drummer and the Cook" (Traditional, Paul Campbell) – 2:04
 "The Fox" (Traditional, Campbell) – 2:43
 "Soldier, Soldier" (Traditional, Campbell) – 1:37
 "The Next Big River" (Traditional, Campbell) – 0:20
 "Delia" (Fred Brooks, Lester Judson) – 2:58
 "Mo Mary" (Richard Dyer-Bennett) – 2:15
 "Lord Randall" (Traditional, Campbell) – 4:07

Paul Campbell was a fictitious entity used to copyright material in the public domain.

Personnel 
 Harry Belafonte  – vocals
 Millard Thomas – guitar
 Orchestra and chorus supervised by Hugo Winterhalter
Production notes:
 Hugo Winterhalter – producer
 Henri René – producer
 Jack Lewis – producer
 Joe Carlton – producer
 Kysar – cover art
 Leonard Feather – liner notes

References 

1954 debut albums
American folklore
Harry Belafonte albums
RCA Victor albums